The following is the squad list for the 2015 Pacific Games.

Those marked in bold have been capped at full International level.

Group A

Head coach:  Juan Carlos Buzzetti

Head coach:  Stanley Foster

Head coach:  Patrice Flaccadori

Head coach: Richard Iwai

Group B

Head coach:  Thierry Sardo

Head coach:  Anthony Hudson

Notes

Head coach:  Ricki Herbert

Head coach: Patrick Miniti

References 

squads